Broner is a surname. Notable people with the surname include:

Adrien Broner (born 1989), American boxer
E. M. Broner (1927–2011), American author

See also
Bronner